Bierebo, or Bonkovia-Yevali, is an Oceanic language spoken on Epi Island, in Vanuatu.

References

Epi languages
Vulnerable languages